Tanzania is a multilingual country. There are many languages spoken in the country, but no one language is spoken natively by a majority or a large plurality of the population. Swahili and English, the latter of which was inherited from colonial rule (see Tanganyika Territory), are widely spoken as lingua francas.  They serve as working languages in the country, with Swahili being the official national language. There are more speakers of Swahili than of English in Tanzania.

Overview

According to Ethnologue, there are a total of 126 languages spoken in Tanzania. Two are institutional, 18 are developing, 58 are vigorous, 40 are endangered, and 8 are dying. There are also three languages that recently became extinct.

Most languages spoken locally belong to two broad language families: Niger-Congo (Bantu branch) and Nilo-Saharan (Nilotic branch), spoken by the country's Bantu and Nilotic populations, respectively. Additionally, the Hadza and Sandawe hunter-gatherers speak languages with click consonants, which have tentatively been classified within the Khoisan phylum (although Hadza may be a language isolate). The Cushitic and Semitic ethnic minorities speak languages belonging to the separate Afro-Asiatic family, with the Hindustani and British residents speaking languages from the Indo-European family.

Tanzania's various ethnic groups typically speak their mother tongues within their own communities. The two official languages, English and Swahili, are used in varying degrees of fluency for communication with other populations. According to the official national linguistic policy announced in 1984, Swahili is the language of the social and political sphere as well as primary and adult education, whereas English is the language of secondary education, universities, technology, and higher courts. The government announced in 2015 that it would discontinue the use of English as a language of education as part of an overhaul of the Tanzanian schools' system.

Additionally, several Tanzanian sign languages are used.

Language families

Major languages

Major languages spoken in Tanzania include:

Niger-Congo
Bantu
Bemba
Bena (592 thousand, 2009)
Chaga
Digo (166 thousand, 2009)
Gogo (1.08 million, 2009)
Haya (1.94 million, 2016)
Hehe (1.21 million, 2016)
Iramba
Luguru (404 thousand, 2009)
Makonde (1.47 million, 2016)
Ngoni
Nyakyusa
Nyamwezi (1.47 million, 2016)
Nyika
Pare
Rangi (410 thousand, 2007)
Safwa (322 thousand, 2009)
Sonjo
Sukuma (8.13 million, 2016)
Swahili
Tongwe language
Tumbuka (400 thousand, 2007)
Turu
Vidunda language
Yao (630 thousand, 2016)
Zanaki
Kerewe
Nyaturu
Nyambo
Gweno
Kilindi
Nyamwezi
West Kilimanjaro (Meru)
Nilo-Saharan
Nilotic
Datooga
Kisankasa
Maasai (682 thousand, 2016)
Ngasa
Ogiek
Luo (185 thousand, 2009)
Zinza language
Sambaa language (660 thousand (2001))

Minor languages
Languages spoken by the country's ethnic minorities include:

Khoisan
Khoe
Hadza (possibly a language isolate)
Sandawe (possibly a language isolate)
Afro-Asiatic
Cushitic
Alagwa
Burunge
Gorowa
Iraqw
Semitic
Arabic
Indo-European
Indo-Iranian
Gujarati
Hindustani
Kutchi
Germanic
English
German
Romance
French
Portuguese

Extinct languages
Asa language

See also
Languages of Africa

References

Further reading
Nurse, D. and Philippson, G. (2019). CLDF dataset derived from Nurse and Philippson's "Tanzania Language Survey" from 1975 (Version v3.0) [Data set]. Zenodo.

External links
Languages of Tanzania at Ethnologue site.
Map of languages of Tanzania at Ethnologue